Light Art Space (LAS) is a non-profit art foundation in Berlin, Germany. It was launched in 2019 by Jan Fischer and Bettina Kames.

History 
LAS was established as a platform for exhibitions exploring the intersections between science, technology and art. The foundation was co-founded by transport entrepreneur Jan Fischer and the art historian Bettina Kames, who both wanted to bring these themes to non-specialist audiences. Currently the foundation does not have a fixed location and the exhibitions take place across different sites in Berlin, including Kraftwerk Berlin and Halle am Berghain. The current head of programmes is curator Amira Gad.

Programming 
The first exhibition at LAS was Refik Anadol's Latent Being held at Kraftwerk Berlin in 2019, an exhibition exploring artificial intelligence and human engagement with the physical world. In 2021–22, US-born Light and Space artist Robert Irwin created a bespoke installation, titled Light and Space, commissioned by LAS, which was also displayed at Kraftwerk Berlin. Other artists exhibiting with LAS include Libby Heaney, Jakob Kudsk Steensen, Ian Cheng, Alexandra Daisy Ginsberg and Judy Chicago. 

The exhibitions tend to deal with themes of technology, artificial intelligence, quantum computing and the environment. The foundation commissions artists to create site specific artworks at different sites across Berlin, for example, Kudsk Steensen was commissioned to create an artwork to be displayed at Halle am Berghain, where he installed a virtual reality swamp. The exhibition's title Berl-Berl derived from the old slavic word for swamp. Libby Heaney's 2022 exhibition Ent-, exhibited at Schering Stiftung, used quantum code to reinterpret the 15th century artwork The Garden of Earthly Delights by the Dutch painter Hieronymus Bosch.

Partners for exhibitions have included the Museum für Naturkunde Berlin and Israeli dance company L-E-V Dance founded by Sharon Eyal and Gai Behar.

External links 

 LAS website

References 

Art museums and galleries in Germany
Art museums and galleries in Berlin
Modern art museums